The Brisbane Lions' 2005 season was its ninth season in the Australian Football League (AFL).

Season summary

Pre-season

2005 Wizard Home Loans Cup

Premiership Season

Home and away season

Ladder

References

Brisbane Lions Season, 2005
Brisbane Lions seasons